Aruban may refer to:
 Something of, or related to Aruba
 A person from Aruba, or of Aruban descent; see demographics of Aruba
 A dialect of Papiamento
Aruban culture

See also 
 
 List of Arubans
 Languages of Aruba

Language and nationality disambiguation pages